FC Vidnoye is a Russian football team from Vidnoye, Moscow Oblast. It played professionally in the Russian Second Division in 2003 and 2004. In 2003 it took sixth place in the West Zone, and it was leading the table in the middle of the 2004 season when it was forced to drop out of the competition due to financial problems. It now plays on amateur level.

Team name and location history
 2002: FC Nosorogi Volodarskogo
 2003–: FC Vidnoye

External links
  Official site
  Team history by footballfacts

Association football clubs established in 2002
Football clubs in Russia
Football in Moscow Oblast
2002 establishments in Russia